Star Trek: Discovery is an American television series created by Bryan Fuller and Alex Kurtzman for the streaming service CBS All Access (later rebranded as Paramount+). Premiering in 2017, it is the seventh Star Trek series and was the first since Star Trek: Enterprise concluded in 2005. It follows the crew of the starship Discovery, beginning a decade before Star Trek: The Original Series in the 23rd century. At the end of the second season, Discovery travels to the 32nd century, which is the setting for subsequent seasons.

 A final 10-episode fifth season is set to premiere in early 2024.

Series overview

Episodes

Season 1 (2017–18)

Season 2 (2019)

Season 3 (2020–21)

Season 4 (2021–22)

Season 5

A 10-episode fifth season was ordered by Paramount+ in January 2022, and filming began that June. The season was expected to premiere in early 2023, but Paramount announced in March 2023 that it would debut in early 2024 and would be the last for the series.

See also

 Lists of Star Trek episodes

References

General references

External links
 
 

 
Discovery Episodes